Syagrus may refer to:
Syagrus (legendary poet), a legendary Greek oral poet
Syagrus (plant), a genus of palm trees
Syagrus (beetle), a genus of beetle in the family Chrysomelidae, the leaf beetles